Sunset in El Dorado  is a 1945 American Western film directed by Frank McDonald and starring Roy Rogers.

Cast
 Roy Rogers as himself
 Trigger as Roy's horse
 Dale Evans as Lucille Wiley/Kansas Kate 
 George 'Gabby' Hayes as Gabby
 Margaret Dumont as Aunt Dolly/Aunt Arabella 
 Hardie Albright as Cecil Phelps/Cyril Earle 
 Roy Barcroft as Buster Welch
 Tom London as Sheriff Gridley
 Stanley Price as Henchman Lyle Fish
 Robert J. Wilke as Henchman Curly Roberts
 Ed Cassidy as U. S. Marshall
 Dorothy Granger as Maise - Switchboard Operator
 Bob Nolan as Band leader of Sons of the Pioneers

External links
 

1945 films
Republic Pictures films
1945 Western (genre) films
American Western (genre) films
American black-and-white films
Films directed by Frank McDonald
1940s English-language films
1940s American films